Klonowa may refer to the following places:
Klonowa, Greater Poland Voivodeship (west-central Poland)
Klonowa, Łódź Voivodeship (central Poland)
Klonowa, Masovian Voivodeship (east-central Poland)